Adama Traoré (born 17 January 1989) is a Malian professional footballer who plays as a forward.

Club career
Born in Bamako, Traoré began his career with the Centre Salif Keita before signing for Paris Saint-Germain. He signed for Saint-Dié in 2009. In January 2010, Traoré joined Calais.

International career
Traoré was part of the under-20 team that represented Mali at the 2009 African Youth Championship in Rwanda.

References

External links 
 
 
 

1989 births
Living people
Sportspeople from Bamako
Association football midfielders
Malian footballers
JS Centre Salif Keita players
Paris Saint-Germain F.C. players
SR Saint-Dié players
Calais RUFC players
Moulins Yzeure Foot players
Al-Markhiya SC players
Mesaimeer SC players
Malian expatriates in France
Malian expatriate footballers
Expatriate footballers in France
Expatriate footballers in Qatar
Expatriate footballers in Malta
Malian expatriate sportspeople in France
Malian expatriate sportspeople in Qatar
Malian expatriate sportspeople in Malta